Stanley Pinker (1924 – 16 June 2012) was a Namibian-born painter and printmaker.

References 

1924 births
2012 deaths
South African painters
South African male painters
White Namibian people
Namibian expatriates in South Africa
People from Windhoek
South African military personnel of World War II
Recipients of the Molteno medal